The Coral Reef Restaurant is a themed seafood restaurant in The Seas Pavilion (formerly The Living Seas pavilion)  on the western side of Future World (now renamed World Nature) at Epcot, a theme park at the Walt Disney World Resort in Bay Lake, Florida, that opened with the pavilion on January 15, 1986. One entire wall of the restaurant consists of a glass window that is eight inches thick and that provides a view into an aquarium. While they eat, restaurant guests are able to watch tarpons, sharks, sea turtles, stingrays, groupers, and sometimes scuba divers in the six-million-gallon aquarium. Artist Kim Minichiello painted the underwater scene that appears on the restaurant's menu covers. Ron Douglas's cookbook America's Most Wanted Recipes: Just Desserts includes two dishes from the Coral Reef Restaurant: the Baileys and Jack Daniel's Mousse and the Chocolate Wave Cake.

See also
 List of seafood restaurants

References

Bibliography

Epcot
Walt Disney World restaurants
Seafood restaurants in Florida
Aquaria in Florida
Oceanaria in the United States
Restaurants established in 1986
Future World (Epcot)
World Nature